Daniel Charney (1888, Dukora, Russian Empire (now Belarus) – 1959, New York), was a Yiddish poet and journalist.

Charney was active in Moscow Yiddish circles in the early 1920s.  After living in Moscow, Vilna, Warsaw, Berlin, and Paris, he emigrated to New York in 1941.

He worked for the Yiddish daily Der Tog from 1925 until his death.

His brothers were author Shmuel Niger and labor leader and journalist Baruch Charney Vladeck.

External links
 Daniel Charney papers at YIVO, New York
Daniel Charney digitized works at Steven Spielberg Digital Yiddish Library, Yiddish Book Center, Amherst, Massachusetts

References

Yiddish culture in Russia
Belarusian Jews
Yiddish culture in the United States
Belarusian journalists
1888 births
1959 deaths
People from Puchavičy District
Jewish American journalists
Russian-Jewish culture in the United States
20th-century journalists
Emigrants from the Russian Empire to the United States